Kim Tae-hyung may refer to:

 Kim Tae-hyung, birth name of V (singer), member of South Korean boyband BTS
 Kim Tae-hyung (born 1992), birth name of J.Seph of South Korean co-ed group Kard
 Kim Tae-hyoung (born 1967), South Korean baseball player
 Kim Tae-hyung (footballer) (born 1989), South Korean footballer

See also
Kim (Korean surname)